The Kocian Quartet is a Czech classical chamber ensemble. Originally named the New String Quartet, it was founded in 1972 by three members of the Prague Symphony Orchestra and Pravoslav Kohout. In 1975 they were renamed the Kocian Quartet. They have regularly appeared at the Prague Spring International Music Festival since 1976.

References

External links 
 

1972 establishments in Czechoslovakia
Musical groups established in 1972
Czech string quartets